Malerie Marder is an American photographer and artist who lives and works in Los Angeles, California.

Career
Her work centers on vivid color and black-and-white nude photographs, and has gained attention in the first decade of the new century because of its disquieting personal, sexual, and psychological aspects. The artist examines human intimacy by photographing friends and family undressed.

Marder's video work, At Rest, was first shown at Salon 94 in 2003. The artist edited videotape shot over two years into nearly 13 minutes of friends and family, always naked, in various states of repose: couples asleep in bed, a child resting on a plump pillow, a woman relaxing in the bathtub. Composer Jonathan Bepler produced the soundtrack.

Marder completed her MFA from Yale University in New Haven, Connecticut, and in 1999 was included in the exhibition Another Girl, Another Planet alongside twelve other photographers, including Katy Grannan, Justine Kurland, Dana Hoey and Sarah Jones.

Publication
Carnal Knowledge. Violette Editions, 2011. . Edited and produced by Robert Violette. Edition of 25 copies. With text contributions by Charlotte Cotton, Gregory Crewdson, Philip-Lorca diCorcia, James Ellroy, James Frey, AM Homes, and Bruce Wagner.

Collections
Marder's work is held in the following permanent collections:
Solomon R. Guggenheim Museum, New York
Metropolitan Museum of Art, New York
National Gallery of Victoria, Melbourne, Australia
National Gallery of Art, Washington, DC.

References

External links

American photographers
Bard College alumni
Yale University alumni
1971 births
Living people
American women photographers
21st-century American women